Highway 24 is a highway in the Canadian province of Saskatchewan. It runs from Highway 3 near Spiritwood to Chitek Lake near the Chitek Lake Recreation Site. Highway 24 also passes near the communities of Laventure], Leoville, Panton and Penn. Intersections along Highway 24 are with Highways 793, 696 and 945.

In April 2014, due to its state of disrepair, it was named the worst highway in Saskatchewan by the Canadian Automobile Association (CAA). In September of 2020, repairs began on the highway as part of a plan to stimulate the local economy.

References 

024